Frank Pugliese is an American TV writer and artistic director. He won a WGA Award for the Homicide: Life on the Street episode "Night of the  Dead Living." He is also a playwright. In 2017 Pugliese became the co-showrunner of House of Cards.

Pugliese's plays include: Aven'U Boys (Obie Award), The King of Connecticut, The Talk, The Alarm, Matty's Place, The Summer Winds,  and "Hope" is the Thing with Feathers. His screenplays include: Aven' U Boys, 29th Street, Born to Run, Dion, Infamous, Shot in the Heart; and Italian.

Publication 
Plays By Frank Pugliese, containing Aven'U Boys, "Hope" Is A Thing With Feathers & The Summer Winds, Broadway Play Publishing Inc.

References 

The New School faculty
Living people
American television writers
American male television writers
American male dramatists and playwrights
American dramatists and playwrights
John Dewey High School alumni
Screenwriters from New York (state)
Year of birth missing (living people)